San Ignacio Downtown Airstrip is a pair of public dirt runways located East of San Ignacio, Municipality of Mulegé, Baja California Sur, Mexico. The airstrips are used solely for general aviation purposes. Although the airstrip is not paved as the San Ignacio West Airport, it's closer to the town and this is the advantage of using this airstrip. The SGM 2 and MSIC codes are used as identifiers.

External links
 Baja Bush Pilot forum about San Ignacio airstrips.

Airports in Baja California Sur
Mulegé Municipality